No Stoppin' That Rockin' is a 1982 single recorded by Instant Funk for Salsoul Records. It was produced by Bunny Sigler and written by Dennis Richardson.

Side A was remixed by Salsoul-era remixer Tom Moulton. Side B was remixed by Sergio Munzabai of Morales and Munzibai duo.

Reception 
The single peaked at number 32 on the Billboard Black Singles chart in 1982. It was even included in the "recommended" section of the Billboard Top Single Picks in the same year.

Track listing

1982 release  
12" vinyl
 US:  Salsoul / SG 385
 US:  Salsoul / SG 385 DJ

Personnel 
Arrangement, composer: Dennis Richardson
Mastering: Herbie Jr
Remix: Sergio Munzibai (2–4), Tom Moulton (1)
Produced for Bundino Productions.

Chart performance

References 

1982 singles
1982 songs